Lake Alūksne is located in Alūksne Municipality, Latvia.

The city of Alūksne is located by the lake.

Lake Aluksne is the 11th biggest lake in Latvia (15.437 km²).

The lake contains twelve different species of fish.

There are four islands within Lake Aluksne. The ruins of historic Alūksne Castle are on the largest island (known as Castle Island or St. Mary's Island, because the castle was originally called Marienburg, "St. Mary's Castle").

Alūksne River (a tributary of Pededze) flows out of the lake.

References

Website of the lake's manager

Aluksne
Alūksne